In economics, a consumer unit is defined as either (1) all members of a particular household who are related by blood, marriage, adoption, or other legal arrangements; (2) a person living alone or sharing a household with others or living as a roomer in a private home or lodging house or in permanent living quarters in a hotel or motel, but who is financially independent; or (3) two or more persons living together who pool their income to make joint expenditure decisions. Financial independence is determined by the three major expense categories: housing, food, and other living expenses. To be considered financially independent, a respondent must provide at least two of the three major expense categories.

See also
 Bureau of Labor Statistics
 Consumer Expenditure Survey

References

External links
 Consumer unit in glossary, U.S. Bureau of Labor Statistics Division of Information Services

Unit